Planet Exotica (7.6 hectares) is a commercial botanical garden located at 5 avenue des Fleurs de la Paix, Royan, Charente-Maritime, Nouvelle-Aquitaine, France. It is open daily; an admission fee is charged.

The gardens include Japanese gardens, Tuscan landscapes, a bonsai collection (400 m2), an orchid greenhouse described as the largest in France (700 m2, about 3,000 specimens), a butterfly conservatory, bamboo labyrinth with artificial fog, boat trips through the marshes, and water games. Of particular interest is an olive tree imported from Spain, 4m high, 7m in circumference, with an estimated age of 1800 years.

See also 
 List of botanical gardens in France

References 

 Parc Jardins du Monde
 Au Jardin description (French)
 Gralon.net description (French)
 Je Decouvre La France description (French)
 Photographs

Jardins du Monde, Parc
Jardins du Monde, Parc